Pravisdomini is a comune (municipality) in the Province of Pordenone in the Italian region Friuli-Venezia Giulia, located about  west of Trieste and about  south of Pordenone.

Pravisdomini borders the following municipalities: Annone Veneto, Azzano Decimo, Chions, Meduna di Livenza, Pasiano di Pordenone, Pramaggiore.

References

Cities and towns in Friuli-Venezia Giulia